Pobre Clara is a Mexican telenovela produced by Valentín Pimstein for Televisa in 1975.

Cast 
Celia Castro as Clara Escobedo
Julio Alemán as Dr. Cristian de la Huerta
María Rivas as Doña Mercedes Escobedo
Carlos Bracho as Francisco Escobedo
Ana Luisa Peluffo as Lucia
Andrea Palma as Doña Beatriz
Alicia Montoya as Tía Emilia
Gregorio Casal as René
Alfredo Leal as Arturo
Carmen Salas as Clarita Lozano
Isabela Corona as Nieves
Bárbara Gil as Mary
Alma Muriel as Susana
Julio Monterde as Óscar
Alan Conrad as Gerente
Miguel Suárez Arias as Alfaro
Mauricio Ferrari as Roberto
Hernán Guido as Edy
Marcela López Rey as Liliana
Estela Chacón as Ana María Lozano
Luz Adriana as Juanita
Rosángela Balbó as Lourdes

References

External links 

Mexican telenovelas
1975 telenovelas
Televisa telenovelas
Spanish-language telenovelas
1975 Mexican television series debuts
1975 Mexican television series endings